Amou, Togo is a prefecture located in the Plateaux Region of Togo. The prefecture seat is located in Amlamé.

Canton (administrative divisions) of Amou include Ouma (Amlamé), Logbo (Témédja), Ikponou (Akposso-Nord) Otadi, Amou-Oblo, Ekpégnon, Kpatégan, Hihéatro, Gamé, Imlé, Avédji-Itadi, Adiva, Evou, and Okpahoé-Sodo.

Amou in Legend
Amou was also believed to be the source of the mystical power behind both the Pharaonic and the Nubian civilizations. According to the ancient myths, it was thought that with the demise of these two civilizations, the secrets of the Amou had disappeared forever. The secret of the Amou is supposed to have four functions: Anotra (Health), Marnav (Wealth), Ostvat (Fortune) and Unvst (Love).

References

Prefectures of Togo
Plateaux Region, Togo